This is a list of mayors of Brandon, Manitoba.

1882–1884 - Thomas Mayne Daly
1885–1886 - James A. Smart
1887 - Charles Adams
1888–1889 - Alexander C. Fraser
1890–1891 - Andrew Kelly
1892–1894 - Dr. John McDiarmid
1895–1896 - James A. Smart
1897–1898 - Ezekiel Evans
1899 - Alexander C. Fraser
1900 - Dr. John McDiarmid
1901–1902 - Alexander C. Fraser
1903–1904 - Robert Hall
1905–1906 - John W. Fleming
1907–1908 - Stephen E. Clement
1909–1910 - Henry L. Adolph
1911–1913 - John W. Fleming
1914 - Joseph Henry Hughes
1915–1918 - H.W. Cater
1919 - A.R. McDiarmid
1920–1921 - George Dinsdale

1932–1933 - E. Fotheringham
1934–1937 - H.W. Cater
1938–1943 - F.H. Young
1944–1945 - L.H. McDorman
1946–1951 - Frank T. Williamson
1952–1955 - James Creighton
1956–1957 - Dr. Stuart Schultz
1958–1961 - James Creighton
1962–1969 - Stephen A. Magnacca
1970–1974 - W.K. Wilton
1975–1977 - Elwood C. Gorrie
1978 - G.D. Box
1979–1989 - Ken Burgess
1989–1997 - Rick Borotsik
1997–2002 - Reg Atkinson
2002–2010 - Dave Burgess
2010–2014 - Shari Decter Hirst
2014–2022 - Rick Chrest
2022–present - Jeff Fawcett

References 
 

Brandon